Darreh Rud (also Romanized as Darreh Rūd) is a village in Gughar Rural District, in the Central District of Baft County, Kerman Province, Iran. According to the 2006 census, its population was 21, in 4 families.

References 

Populated places in Baft County